Hannah Evyenia Karydas, known professionally as Eves Karydas and formerly Eves the Behavior, is an Australian pop singer-songwriter.

Early life
Hannah Karydas was born in Cairns on 20 July 1994. She was raised there until her family relocated to Brisbane when she was a teenager. Her grandfather was a Greek immigrant who moved to Australia after the Second World War.

Musical career

2009-2013: Career beginnings 
On 26 July 2009, Karydas released her debut EP Fairytales. In July 2011, she released her second EP, WRITE. On 5 April 2013, she released her single "Scrutinize". On 15 July 2013, she released her single "Heavy", her last appearance under her real name. On 15 September 2013, Karydas released the single "Zen" under her new name Eves.

2014–2016: Eves the Behavior
In 2014, Karydas was signed on to the Dew Process label, and revealed her new name Eves The Behavior. She stated "I added Behavior to my name because it gave me the chance to add another connotation to who I am and what I stand for." In 2015, Karydas moved from her home in Brisbane to London to pursue a music career. On 19 January 2015, Karydas released her first single under the Eves The Behavior moniker, "TV".  On 17 May 2015, she released her single "Electrical". On 24 July 2015, she released her self-titled EP, Eves The Behavior. On 13 November 2015 she released her single "Girl", her last appearance under the moniker Eves the Behavior.

2017–2019: Summerskin
Karydas stayed in London writing and recording new music. On 3 November 2017, she released her first new single "There for You" under her new name Eves Karydas, co-produced by Chris Zane. Eves stated the reason for changing her name was "because [she is] half Greek and it [was] a nice reminder to [her] of where [she] grew up and where [she came] from." In 2018, she supported British singer Dua Lipa on her Australian tour.

On 19 January 2018, she released the single "Further Than the Planes Fly", which later went on to reach Platinum level sales on the ARIA charts. On 18 May, her third single "Couch" was released, a music video followed in July. On 24 August she released her fourth single, "Damn Loyal". In September, Karydas released her debut studio album and announced a 2019 national tour that commenced in February 2019. She supported British artist George Ezra on his 2019 Australian tour.

On 5 February, her fifth single from Summerskin, "Wildest Ones" was released alongside an accompanying music video.

2020–present: Reruns & Wide Eyed
On 4 June 2020, she released her first new single in nearly two years, "Complicated". On 5 August 2021, Karydas announced the release of the EP Reruns and released its fourth single "Lemonade". Karydas released the fifth single of the EP, "Cardboard Box" on 3 September 2021.

In October 2022, Karydas released "Last Night When We Were Young", the lead single from a forthcoming EP, titled Wide Eyed and scheduled for release on 25 November 2022.

Discography

Studio albums

Extended plays

Singles

Other appearances

Notes

Filmography

Television

Podcasts

Awards and nominations

Queensland Music Awards
The Queensland Music Awards (previously known as Q Song Awards) are an annual award ceremony celebrating Queensland's brightest emerging artists and established legends. They commenced in 2006.

! 
|-
! scope="row"| 2016
| "TV" (directed by Hannah Karydas and Adam Spark)
| Video of the Year
| 
| 
|}

References 

1994 births
Living people
Australian women pop singers
Dew Process artists
21st-century Australian women singers
Australian people of Greek descent
Australian indie pop musicians